This is a list of seasons completed by the Albany Great Danes football team of the National Collegiate Athletic Association (NCAA) Division I Football Championship Subdivision (FCS).

Seasons

References

Albany

Albany Great Danes football seasons